Guasopa Airport , is an airport at Guasopa on Woodlark Island, in the Milne Bay Province, Papua New Guinea.

History

World War II
U.S. forces captured Woodlark Island on 30 June 1943 as part of Operation Chronicle. The 60th US Naval Construction Battalion began construction on 2 July of a  coralsurfaced runway which was ready for use by 14 July. The runway was later expanded and by September measured  and by October 12 a parallel  runway was also built, together with 110 hardstands. The airfield was also known as Woodlark Airfield. The airfield was used as a stopover point and refuelling point.

RAAF:
No. 78 Squadron RAAF P-40s
USAAF:
39th Fighter Squadron operating P-39s
67th Fighter Squadron operating P-39s

See also
Naval Base Woodlark Island

References

Guasopa Airfield

Airports in Papua New Guinea
Woodlark Islands
Milne Bay Province
Airfields of the United States Army Air Forces in Papua New Guinea
Papua New Guinea in World War II
Airports established in 1943
1940s establishments in Papua New Guinea